Najat Driouech Ben Moussa (born 1981) is a politician for the Republican Left of Catalonia (ERC). She has served in the Parliament of Catalonia since the 2017 elections, and is the first Muslim woman in that legislature.

Biography
Driouech was born in 1981 in Asilah, Morocco and moved to El Masnou in Catalonia in 1990. She holds qualifications in Arab Studies and Social Work, and has taught the former at the University of Barcelona; she was the first female of El Masnou's Muslim community to have a university education. Since 2001, she had worked for El Masnou city council in migrant-related affairs.

Driouech was elected to the Parliament of Catalonia for the Republican Left of Catalonia in the Province of Barcelona in the 2017 elections. She became the first Muslim woman elected to the legislature, while two men from the faith had previously served. She has worn a hijab since 2009, and has said "I have the right to be different, exactly the same as if a colleague decided to go dressed in pink".

In December 2018, Driouech made a parliamentary speech against the far-right party Vox, after they entered their first regional parliament in Andalusia. Vox leader Santiago Abascal shared the video to his followers with the comment "And this one calls us male chauvinists... she should look at her own house first!" in reference to her religion.

For the 2021 Catalan elections, Driouech was moved from tenth to fourth in the ERC's list.

References

External links
Najat Driouech at Parliament of Catalonia (in Catalan)

Living people
1981 births
People from Asilah
People from El Masnou
Moroccan emigrants to Spain
Academic staff of the University of Barcelona
Republican Left of Catalonia politicians
Women members of the Parliament of Catalonia
Members of the 12th Parliament of Catalonia
Moroccan Muslims
Spanish Muslims